Texas Tower 3 (ADC ID: TT-3) was a former United States Air Force Texas Tower General Surveillance Radar station, first operational in November 1956.   southeast of the coast of Nantucket, Massachusetts, in 80 feet of water. The tower was closed in 1963 and dismantled.

Located in Nantucket Shoals, Texas Tower 3 was one in a series of crewed radar stations that were so named because they resembled the oil-drilling platforms of the Gulf of Mexico. Air Defense Command (ADC) estimated that the Texas Towers would help extend contiguous East Coast radar coverage some 300 to 500 miles seaward. In terms of Soviet military capabilities, this would provide the United States with an extra 30 minutes of warning time in the event of an incoming bomber attack.

History
Texas Tower 3 was constructed in 1956 at the former WWII New England Shipbuilding Corp. East Yard "basin" in South Portland, Maine. [Contrary to many false reports Tower 3 was NOT built at the Fore River Shipyard in Quincy, Massachusetts. ONLY Tower 2 was built at Quincy. Some confusion might have arisen due to the odd coincidence that both shipyards were located, at least partially, on rivers with identical names.] (1) The Portland (Maine) Evening Express, various articles dated August 2-8,1956; (2) The South Portland (Maine) Historical Society online digital photo collection.)

On 7 August 1956, it was successfully floated and towed to its site and erected. Beginning in November 1956 enough of the structure was complete that one AN/FPS-3 search radar and two AN/FPS-6 height finder radars  developed by Air Force Rome Air Development Center [RADC] New York, were installed.

Personnel from the 773d Radar Squadron, stationed at Montauk Air Force Station, NY were responsible for operation of the tower. It was crewed by 6 officers and 48 airmen. The 4604th Support Squadron (Texas Towers) at Otis AFB, MA provided logistical support. Life aboard Texas Tower 3 was difficult. Both the structure and its crew suffered from the near-constant vibration caused by rotating radar antennas and diesel generators. The surrounding ocean and tower footings also transmitted distant sounds along the steel legs, amplifying them throughout the entire structure.

With the advent of Soviet ICBMs and the bomber threat reduced in importance, the tower was decommissioned in 1963 and demolished shortly thereafter.

In August, 1964 Texas Tower 3 was blown off of its supports and towed to the Federal Yards of the Lipsett Division of Luria Brothers Inc in Kearny, NJ. The platform was proposed for re-purposing possibly as a loading dock or as a drilling platform. It was the only Texas Tower recovered from the ocean.

Units and assignments 
Units:
 773d Radar Squadron (Flight), (Operations unit based at Montauk AFS, NY), 1 June 1958 – 25 March 1963
 4604th Support Squadron (Texas Towers) (Logistics support unit based at Otis AFB, MA), 1 June 1958 – 25 March 1963
Assignments:
 New York Air Defense Sector, 1 June 1958 – 25 March 1963

See also
 List of USAF Aerospace Defense Command General Surveillance Radar Stations

References

 Winkler, David F. (1997), Searching the skies: the legacy of the United States Cold War defense radar program. Prepared for United States Air Force Headquarters Air Combat Command.
  A Handbook of Aerospace Defense Organization 1946 - 1980,  by Lloyd H. Cornett and Mildred W. Johnson, Office of History, Aerospace Defense Center, Peterson Air Force Base, Colorado
 Information for Texas Tower No.3 (Nantucket Shoal)
 The Texas Towers

External links
Gallery of the construction of the tower

Radar stations of the United States Air Force
Installations of the United States Air Force in Massachusetts
Aerospace Defense Command
1958 establishments in the United States
1963 disestablishments in the United States
Military installations established in 1958
Military installations closed in 1963
Buildings and structures demolished in 1963